Abeng (Ä běng) is a novel related to Maroons, published in 1984 by Michelle Cliff. It is a semi-fictional autobiographical novel about a mixed-race Jamaican girl named Clare Savage growing up in the 1950s. It explores the historical repression resulting from British imperialism in Jamaica. Facts regarding imperialism of the island are dispersed throughout the narrative, as well as facts about slavery in Jamaica and Jamaican folklore. It is emphasized that the protagonists are generally unaware of these facts, which often serve to reveal the brutal nature of both slavery and imperialism. In this way Cliff reveals her intentions for the book. It is a piece of revisionist literature meant to challenge the mainstream narrative of Jamaican history. The character Clare Savage would return in Michelle Cliff's next novel, No Telephone to Heaven (1987).

Origins of title
Abeng means an animal horn or musical instrument in the Twi language of the Akan people of Ghana.

The abeng has had two historical uses in Jamaica. It was used by slaveholders to summon slaves to the sugar fields. It was also used by the Maroon army as a method of communication. In a lecture at the University of St. Thomas, Cliff said that the title was a reference to both of these uses, though neither appears in the novel's text; they are referenced in the book's foreword. She further explained that the title is an attempt to "take back" Jamaican history.

External links
 Biography of Michelle Cliff

1984 American novels
Jamaican novels
Novels about slavery
Novels set in Jamaica
Novels set in the 1950s
African-American novels
Novels by Michelle Cliff
Autobiographical novels